Gordon Milne (born 29 March 1937) is an English former football player and manager.

Personal life
Gordon Milne was born in Preston, Lancashire, England and is the son of the Scottish former Preston player Jimmy Milne and Jesse Milne.

Club career
Milne had a successful playing career with amateur side Morecambe, Preston North End, Liverpool (1960–1967), Blackpool (1967–1970) and Wigan Athletic (1970).

He was one of Bill Shankly's first signings, when he moved from Preston North End for £16,000 in August 1960. He made his debut in the 1–0 2nd Division defeat at Anfield by Southampton on 31 August 1960, he scored his first goal in the 10th minute of a 2–1 league win over Newcastle United at St James' Park on 20 September 1961.

Milne was a successful right-half for Liverpool during the 1960s and played a prominent role in Liverpool's rise from the old Second Division, forming a partnership with Gerry Byrne. While at Anfield, he won First Division Championship medals in 1963–64 and 1965–66, a Second Division Championship medal in 1961–62 and two shared Charity Shield triumphs in 1964 and 1965.

Milne missed the 1965 F.A.Cup triumph in 1965 through injury, but played a major role just a few days later as the Reds entertained Inter Milan in the first leg of the European Cup semi final. Bill Shankly sent out the injured pair Milne and Gerry Byrne to parade the F.A Cup before the kick-off. The Reds went on to win the match 3–1 but were beaten 3–0 in the return leg.

International career
Milne was selected to represent England at wing-half 14 times making his debut for Alf Ramsey's team in a prestigious friendly with Brazil at Wembley in a game that took place on 8 May 1963 and finished one-all.

Managerial career
Milne turned to management and coaching with Wigan Athletic as player-manager in January 1970. He managed Wigan from 1970 to 1972, making 73 Northern Premier League appearances for the club, and guided them to a league title and an FA Cup run, which ended with a narrow defeat to Manchester City at Maine Road.

Milne also became the part-time manager of the England Youth team in 1972, helping them to win the European Youth Championship that year.

Milne joined Joe Mercer at Coventry City as team manager in June 1972, taking full control in 1974, upon Mercer's elevation to the Board. He was shortlisted for the England management role following the departure of Sir Alf Ramsey, but was overlooked in favour of Don Revie. He continued at Coventry until 1981, producing several exciting teams and securing the club's First Division status. The 1977–78 season saw Coventry's most exciting top-flight team. Gordon Milne settled on an attacking 4–2–4 formation. A side containing Tommy Hutchison, Mick Ferguson, Ian Wallace, Terry Yorath, Graham Oakey, Bobby MacDonald and Jim Blyth played attacking football that swept many teams aside, often by large margins of victory.

Milne became boss at Leicester City in August 1982, winning promotion in 1982–83 and staying until 1986. He managed Beşiktaş in Turkey for seven years(1987–1994) (where he won three successive titles, during the early 1990s). He has succeeded in creating one of the most successful periods in the history of Beşiktaş J.K. and is still a legend for the Beşiktaş fans. He also managed Nagoya Grampus Eight in Japan before returning to Turkey to take charge of Bursaspor (1996–1997) and then Trabzonspor (1998–1999).

Milne then accepted the role of Director of Football at Newcastle United, and worked alongside manager Bobby Robson between 1999 and 2004.

After a spell as chief executive of the League Managers Association, Milne was employed as Director of Football at Beşiktaş JK Istanbul, Turkey in 2006.

Managerial statistics

Honours

Player
Liverpool
Football League First Division: 1963–64, 1965–66
Football League Second Division: 1961–62
FA Charity Shield: 1964, 1965, 1966

Manager
Wigan Athletic
Northern Premier League: 1970–71
Northern Premier League Challenge Cup: 1971–72

England U18
European Championship: 1972, 1973

Beşiktaş
Süper Lig: 1989–90, 1990–91, 1991–92
Turkish Cup: 1988–89, 1989–90
Turkish Super Cup: 1989, 1992
Chancellor Cup: 1987–88

References

External links

Thisisanfield.com Forgotten Heroes
 www.englandfc.com player profile
 Player profile at LFChistory.net

1937 births
Living people
English people of Scottish descent
English footballers
Association football midfielders
Liverpool F.C. players
Preston North End F.C. players
Wigan Athletic F.C. players
Blackpool F.C. players
Morecambe F.C. players
English Football League players
English Football League representative players
England international footballers
English football managers
Wigan Athletic F.C. managers
Coventry City F.C. managers
Leicester City F.C. managers
Beşiktaş J.K. managers
Nagoya Grampus managers
Bursaspor managers
Trabzonspor managers
English Football League managers
Süper Lig managers
J1 League managers
English expatriate football managers
English expatriate sportspeople in Turkey
English expatriate sportspeople in Japan
Expatriate football managers in Turkey
Expatriate football managers in Japan